Rance Howard (born Harold Engle Beckenholdt; November 17, 1928 – November 25, 2017) was an American actor who starred in film and on television. He was the father of actor and filmmaker Ron Howard and actor Clint Howard, and grandfather of actresses Bryce Dallas Howard and Paige Howard.

Howard appeared in films such as Cool Hand Luke (1967), Chinatown (1974), Splash (1984), Ed Wood (1994), Apollo 13 (1995), Independence Day (1996), A Beautiful Mind (2001), Cinderella Man (2005), Frost/Nixon (2008), Nebraska (2013), and Max Rose (2016). He received a Primetime Emmy Award for Outstanding Children's Program for co-producing the television film The Time Crystal (1981).

Early life
Howard was born Harold Engle Beckenholdt in Newkirk, Kay County, Oklahoma, the son of Ethel Cleo (née Tomlin) and Engel Beckenholdt, a farmer. He changed his name to "Rance Howard" when he became an actor. Howard graduated from Shidler High School in 1946 and studied at the University of Oklahoma.

While in the Air Force, Howard directed plays in Special Services, a unit that provided entertainment for service members.

Career
His professional acting career began in 1948 when he went to New York City, auditioned, and landed a job in a children's touring company. The role that got him noticed nationally for television and film was playing the part of Lindstrom in the touring company of the play Mister Roberts with Henry Fonda in 1950, portraying the character for about a year-and-a-half in major cities across the U.S.

Both Rance and elder son Ron, who was two at the time, made their feature-film debuts together in the 1956 Western Frontier Woman. Later in the 1950s, Rance's roles included his TV debut in the series Kraft Theatre, on which he appeared three times in 1956–57.

After son Ron went on to play Opie in The Andy Griffith Show in the early 1960s, Rance had guest parts in five episodes of the show. Howard was known best for his role on television in 25 episodes of the 1960s TV series Gentle Ben starring his younger son, Clint. Howard played Henry Boomhauer, a backwoodsman who befriended the family. Another well-known TV role was on Babylon 5, in which he had a recurring role as David Sheridan, the father of Babylon 5 captain John Sheridan. He also starred in the short-lived 2000 TV series Driving Me Crazy. His television guest appearances include Gunsmoke, Bonanza, Kung Fu, The Waltons, CBS Schoolbreak Special 1986 episode "The Drug Knot", Angel, 7th Heaven, Cold Case, That's So Raven, and two appearances on Seinfeld (as different characters). On The Waltons, Howard portrayed Dr. McIver in five different episodes, one of which included Ron.

Howard appeared in over 100 films, including the 1967 movie Cool Hand Luke, The Music Man (in an uncredited bit part playing "Oscar Jackson"), and many other films. Howard acted in many of his son Ron's films including Splash, Cocoon, Apollo 13, A Beautiful Mind, Cinderella Man and Frost/Nixon. He also appeared as Dottie and Kit's father in A League of Their Own. In 2013, he played Woody Grant's brother in Nebraska. He often took parts as a priest or minister, county sheriff, or western marshal, and made numerous appearances in films by Joe Dante.

His final film role, completed in September 2017, is also the largest in his career. He plays the role of Carl Robbins in the Michael Worth road-trip drama, Apple Seed, playing on film for the first time the father of his real-life son Clint.

Personal life
Howard married actress Jean Speegle Howard in Burbank, California, in 1949. They remained married until her death in September 2000. Their sons are actor and filmmaker Ron Howard and actor Clint Howard. He was the grandfather of actresses Bryce Dallas Howard and Paige Howard. Ron was born while he served three years in the United States Air Force.

In 2001, Howard married Judy Howard. Judy Howard died in January 2017 in Burbank, 10 months before Howard's death.

Death
Howard died on the morning of November 25, 2017, in Los Angeles, California from heart failure spurred on by a West Nile virus infection.

Filmography
 Sources:

Films

Television

References

External links

 
 
 Rance Howard at Find a Grave
 Interview May, 2014 in The Oklahoman

1928 births
2017 deaths
People from Kay County, Oklahoma
People from Duncan, Oklahoma
Male actors from Oklahoma
United States Air Force airmen
American male film actors
American male television actors
Rance
University of Oklahoma alumni
Burials at Hollywood Forever Cemetery